Firebird Angelo is the protagonist of the Firebird science fiction series of books by American writer Kathy Tyers.
 
Firebird Angelo is described in the series as impatient, prideful, and desperate for attention. These attributes were formed in response to her wastling upbringing.

Biography

Netaian nobility 
Firebird is the youngest of four children, all daughters, of the queen. One is dead (Firebird suspects that Phoena, originally the third-born, killed her), Carradee Angelo is heir apparent, and Phoena Angelo is a reserve heir. This leaves Firebird as a wastling, an extra child that is not needed to safeguard the family succession. Thus, she is to be given her geis orders, orders for an honorable death, through military or suicide.

Wastlings most often enrol in military service as a way to display family honour and discharge the noble duty. In this, Firebird excelled, becoming a superior fighter pilot and team commander. This duty also created the opportunity to discharge her final duty to her family, that of suicide once her service as possible reserve heir was no longer needed.

Cultural rebellion and political firebrand 
Lady Firebird frequently disagrees with the aggressive expansionist policies favoured by her mother and the other nobles (known collectively as the Electorate). She is given an honorary seat in the Electorate, and promptly votes, against orders, against annexing another star system (Veroh) as a planetary buffer system.

Often she would sneak out to gatherings of commoners, where musicians would sing of the legends of freedom of the past. Herself skilled in playing the clairsa, a string instrument similar to the harp, Firebird helped keep these hopes of a better Netaia alive. Firebird herself wrote ballads praising some of these heroes.

Spiritual growth 
Firebird is raised to revere the Nine Powers. Her role as a member of the nobility is to personify them to the populace as a whole, in order to cement the religious and civil authorities into a kind of quasi-theocracy. They have always seemed removed and aloof. Over time she begins to doubt the reality of the Powers as supernatural deities at all, seeing them as mere virtues of successful people, useful to be emulated. However, she maintains the intense imagery of the afterlife as a fiery Dark that Cleanses where penance is made before one can enter the peace of final oblivion.

Later she finds a better course in following the Great Speaker who sung the universe into being.

Marriage 
Brennen Caldwell proposes pair bonding, which she accepts.

Ehretan heritage 
Genetic testing confirms that the source of the Angelo inability to conceive male offspring is an Ehretan anomaly, known as Mazo syndrome. This means that Firebird has also inherited some measure of telepathic ability. She is rated and begins her training between books One (Firebird) and Two (Fusion Fire).

Motherhood 
Firebird travels with her husband, Sentinel Brennen Caldwell, to Tallis, the Federate home world. There, Healing Master Jenner treats Firebird's Mazo Syndrome, an Eheretan disease that causes the inability to conceive male children. Firebird conceives male twins (later named Kinnor, after an instrument called a kinnora, and Kiel, for a bird of paradise on Netaia) and gives birth to them. While in labour, she turns (connects with her Eheretan psionic abilities) and falls deep into psychic shock. She is revived by Master Jenner.

Trivia 
 Every member of the Angelo line is named after a Netaian bird.

References 

Fictional princesses
Fictional women soldiers and warriors
Characters in the Firebird book series